Bossam: Steal the Fate is a South Korean television series directed by Kwon Seok-jang and starring Jung Il-woo, Kwon Yu-ri, Shin Hyun-soo and Kim Tae-woo. Set in the Joseon Dynasty under Gwanghaegun, it depicts the change of fate of a bossam-man Ba-woo, when he mistakenly kidnaps the widowed daughter of the King. MBN's 10th anniversary special drama premiered on May 1, 2021, and aired on every Saturday and Sunday from 21:40 (KST) till July 4, 2021. It is available for streaming on Wavve streaming media.

Bossam: Steal the Fate ended by recording an average viewership of 9.8% nationwide in its last episode, therefore becoming the highest-rated drama in the network's history, a record which was previously held by Graceful Family.

Synopsis
Bossam was a custom in the Joseon period, in which a bachelor wrapped up a widow in a blanket at night and made her his wife.

This custom changes the fate of Ba-woo (Jung Il-woo), when he mistakenly kidnaps Yi Su-kyeong (Kwon Yu-ri), the King's widowed daughter.

Cast

Main 
 Jung Il-woo as Ba-woo/Kim Dae-seok; Kim Je-nam's grandson and Queen Dowager Soseong's nephew.
 Kwon Yu-ri as Yi Su-kyeong, Princess Hwain; the daughter of Gwanghaegun and Royal Consort So-ui of the Papyeong Yun clan. 
 Shin Hyun-soo as Yi Dae-yeob; Yi I-cheom's youngest son and Princess Hwain's brother-in-law.

Supporting

Royal Palace 
Kim Tae-woo as Gwanghaegun; the King and Princess Hwain's father.
So Hee-jung as Royal Consort So-ui of the Papyeong Yun clan; Princess Hwain's mother.
Yang Hyun-min as Kim Ja-jeom 
Shin Dong-mi as Court Lady Jo; Princess Hwain's lady-in-waiting.
Song Seon-mi as Court Lady Kim Gae-shi 
Seo Beom-sik as Jung-yeong; Commander of the Royal Guards.

Yi Dae-yeob's Family 
Lee Jae-yong as Left State Councillor Yi I-cheom; Dae-yeop's father and Princess Hwain's father-in-law.
Myung Se-bin as Lady Haeindang of the Gwangju Yi clan; Yi I-cheom's sister and Dae-yeob's aunt.
Park Myung-shin as Lady Kim; Dae-yeop's mother and Princess Hwain's mother-in-law.
Chu Yeon-gyu as Yi Won-yeob; Dae-yeop's oldest brother.

People around Ba-woo 

 Lee Joon-hyuk as Chun-bae
 Ko Dong-ha as Cha-dol; Ba-woo's son.
Jung Kyung-soon as Lady Jeong; Ba-woo's mother.
 Kim Joo-young as Kim Yeon-ok; Ba-woo's younger sister.

Others 
 Yoon Joo-man as Dae-chul; Yi I-cheom's personal guard.
 Yoo Soon-woong as the monk
 Hong Jae-min as Hyeon-su
 Yoon Young-min as Queen Inmok
 Lee Min-Jae as Prince Neungyang

Special appearances 
 Ra Mi-ran as bossam widow
Kim Sa-kwon as groom of the bossam widow
Jang Young-hyeon as Sungkyunkwan scholar

Production

Casting
On June 29, 2020 Jung Il-woo was confirmed to play lead role. On August 26, 2020 Kwon Yu-ri joined the cast as the female lead. On 11 November, Shin Hyun-soo's agency reported that he was considering a proposal to appear in the new historical drama. In March 2021, the lineup was confirmed.

Filming
On November 23, 2020, it was reported that filming was stopped due to COVID-19 pandemic. An official from production of the drama quoted, "The filming was stopped due to the occurrence of a confirmed case. All the cast and staff are in self-quarantine."

Release
MBN's first historical series, the 10th anniversary special drama premiered on MBN on May 1, 2021, and streamed simultaneously on Wavve.

Original soundtrack

Part 1

Part 2

Part 3

Part 4

Part 5

Part 6

Part 7

Part 8

Part 9

Part 10

Part 11

Part 12

Part 13

Part 14

Part 15

Part 16

Part 17

Part 18

Part 19

Part 20

Reception

Commercial performance
On its first episode, Bossam Steal Fate set a new viewership rating record for an MBN drama premiere.

As per Nielsen Korea, the 11th episode aired on June 5, 2021, logged a national average viewership of 8% with 1.61 million viewers, thereby breaking its own highest ratings.

According to Nielsen Korea, the 20th episode of Bossam: Steal the Fate, aired on July 4, scored an average nationwide rating of 9.8% with a peak of 11.2%, and has set a new record for the highest viewership ever achieved by any drama in MBN's history.

Audience viewership

International broadcast
Recently, on the OTT platform Viki, which is being serviced in the Americas, the Middle East, Oceania and Asia, Bossam: Steal the Fate has risen to the Top 10 US Market Content ranking, as well as scored 9.4/10 in the service user evaluation. With the enthusiastic support of overseas fans, subtitles were created in 11 languages. In Taiwan, it's available for streaming on the popular platform friDay from May 1, 2021. The viewers rating is 4.8 out of 5. It is scheduled to be broadcast on GTV, one of Taiwan's four major broadcasters and KNTV, a Japanese broadcaster specialising in Korean wave, and will be serviced in the second half of this year on terrestrial broadcasters in Vietnam, the Philippines and Singapore.

Awards and nominations

References

Notes

External links
  
 
 
 Bossam: Steal the Fate at Daum 
 Bossam: Steal the Fate at Naver 

Maeil Broadcasting Network television dramas
Korean-language television shows
2021 South Korean television series debuts
South Korean historical television series
Television series set in the Joseon dynasty
Television series by JS Pictures
South Korean romance television series
Television productions postponed due to the COVID-19 pandemic
2021 South Korean television series endings
Wavve original programming